Grammonus is a genus of viviparous brotula.

Species
There are currently 11 recognized species in this genus:
 Grammonus ater (A. Risso, 1810)
 Grammonus claudei (Torre y Huerta, 1930) (Reef-cave brotula)
 Grammonus diagrammus (Heller & Snodgrass, 1903) (Purple brotula)
 Grammonus longhursti (Cohen, 1964)
 Grammonus minutus J. G. Nielsen & Prokofiev, 2010
 Grammonus nagaredai J. E. Randall & Hughes, 2008
 Grammonus opisthodon J. L. B. Smith, 1934 (Bighead brotula)
 Grammonus robustus H. M. Smith & Radcliffe, 1913
 Grammonus thielei J. G. Nielsen & Cohen, 2004
 Grammonus waikiki (Cohen, 1964)
 Grammonus yunokawai J. G. Nielsen, 2007

References

Bythitidae
Ray-finned fish genera